The Dikgatlhong Dam is a dam near the village of Robelela on the Shashe River in Botswana, completed in December 2011.
When full it will hold .

Purpose

The project should increase the secure supply of water for Gaborone, Francistown, and towns and villages along the north–south route for the foreseeable future.
Water will also be fed to the Palapye coalfields and to the proposed 1,200 MW power station at Mmamabula.
Project costs for the dam were around P1,134 million (US$300 million).
The pipeline would cost another P1,127 million.
The reservoir may also attract tourists drawn by wildlife, water sports and local food, if facilities are developed.

Structure

The quality of available clay was marginal and required careful selection, treatment and quality control.
The rock, and aggregate for concrete production, came from an on-site quarry.

The geology of the reservoir is very variable.
When filled, the reservoir will have backwater reach of about  up river.

A  steel bridge connects the intake tower to the top of the dam embankment.
The project also included building housing and power supply, and upgrading  of road between the villages of Mmadinare and Robelela.
The pipeline will connect to the NSC at the BPT1 break pressure tank at Moralane.

Construction

Before construction could begin, the bodies of people buried in the Matopi and Robelela villages had to be exhumed and relocated.
This was explained at village dikgotla meetings to gain community approval.
Some farms were purchased upstream.
The government also arranged for counselling services on AIDS both to construction workers and to residents of the Mmadinare, Robelela, Matopi, Matsiloje, Chokwe and Patayamatebele villages.
Preparations were made for additional demands for health and policing services.

A joint venture of Bergstan Africa of Botswana and Jeffares & Green of South Africa undertook technical design and construction supervision. 
The dam was built for the Department of Water Affairs by Sinohydro Corporation of China. 
At times, the language barrier caused problems, when the engineers were unsure whether the contractor understood what was required,
since interpreters without technical training were being used.
PPC Cement of Botswana supplied cement.  Concrete was manufactured onsite using onsite quarries.

Construction began in March 2008.
Unseasonal flooding in the dry season in June 2009 disrupted the construction project.
The contractor managed to recover lost time through hiring additional workers.
Sinohydro announced completion in December 2011, ahead of the planned February 2012 date.
Sinohydro received a takeover certificate in January 2012. 
A diversion channel was left open in the embankment for the river flow while the dam was built over the Shashe River.
Final closure of the diversion channel and the spillway was scheduled for October 2012 in time to start impounding the wet season's rains.

In June 2012, stakeholders were told that construction of the pipeline was behind schedule.
This part of the project had started in October 2011 and was due for completion in October 2013.
The contractors, China State Construction Engineering Corp and the local Excavator Hire, had 350 employees, 75 of whom were Chinese.
The delay was caused by failure of a factory in Palapye to produce pipes of acceptable quality.
There were some concerns that further delays could occur if there were problems with blasting along the section from the Letsibogo Dam to Moralane.  Along this stretch, the new pipeline runs parallel to the NSC pipeline, and great care must be taken to ensure no damage is done to the NSC.

References

Sources

 
 

 

Reservoirs and dams in Botswana
Dams completed in 2011
Dams in Botswana